Alvin Youngblood Hart (born Gregory Edward Hart; March 2, 1963) is an American musician.

Career
Hart was born in Oakland, California, and spent some time in Carroll County, Mississippi, in his youth, where he was influenced by the Mississippi country blues performed by his relatives.
Hart is known as one of the world's foremost practitioners of country blues. He is also known as a faithful torchbearer for 1960s and 1970s guitar rock, as well as western swing and traditional country. His style has been compared to Lead Belly and Spade Cooley. Bluesman Taj Mahal once said about Hart: "The boy has got thunder in his hands." Hart himself said, "I guess my big break came when I opened for Taj Mahal for four nights at Yoshi's."

His debut album, Big Mama's Door, was released in 1996 on Okeh Records. In 2003, Hart's album Down in the Alley was nominated for a Grammy Award for Best Traditional Blues Album.

Albums

 Big Mama's Door (1996)
 Territory (1998)
 Start With The Soul (2000)
 Down In The Alley (2002)
 Motivational Speaker (2005)

Awards
W.C. Handy Award for best new artist – 1997
Down Beat magazine award for best blues album of the year for Territory, 1999
 Grammy Award in 2005 for producing and contribution to the compilation album, Beautiful Dreamer

See also
 List of blues mandolinists

References

External links
Alvin Youngblood Hart 

1963 births
American blues guitarists
American male guitarists
American blues singers
American male singers
Living people
Slide guitarists
Musicians from Oakland, California
Contemporary blues musicians
Grammy Award winners
Singers from California
American blues mandolinists
Guitarists from California
20th-century American guitarists
20th-century American male musicians